Klara Borisovna Novikova (born Herzer, December 12, 1946, Kiev) is a Soviet and Russian pop artist, humorist. Honored Artist of the Russian Federation (1992), People's Artist of Russia (1997). Members of the Public Council of the Russian Jewish Congress.

Biography 
Klara Novikova was born December 12, 1946 in Kiev, into the family of a war veteran, director of a shoe store at the hem, Boris Herzer and housewives Polina Weinstein. She graduated from the Kiev studio variety circus art and Russian Academy of Theatre Arts.

In 1974 she became the winner of the All-Union Competition entertainers, chairman of the jury which was Arkady Raikin. In 1976 she went to work in Mosconcert and settled in Moscow.

Since 1992, Klara Novikova in the Moscow theater pop miniatures, headed Mikhail Zhvanetsky.

In 2010, together with the  Gesher Theater Klara Novikova first tried her hands in the role of a dramatic actress, playing the lead female role in the play "The Late Love " (directed by  Yevgeny Aryeh on the play by   Valery Muharyamov In the Shadow of the Vineyard,  written on the story by Nobel Prize winner Isaac Bashevis Singer).

Personal life 
 First husband –  drummer Victor Novikov, a fellow student at the circus school.
 Second husband –  a sports journalist Yuri Leonidovich Zerchaninov (1931-2009), head of the department of journalism of the magazine Yunost.
The daughter –  Maria Zerchaninova (born 1976), a journalist who teaches at the University of theater critics

References

External links

People's Artists of Russia
Honored Artists of the Russian Federation
Russian Academy of Theatre Arts alumni
1946 births
Living people
Artists from Kyiv
Russian women comedians
Ukrainian Jews
Russian television presenters
Russian television actresses
Russian humorists
Jewish humorists
Women humorists
Russian women television presenters
Entertainers from Kyiv
Jewish Russian actors